The High Wall is a 1964 Czech drama directed by Karel Kachyňa from a screenplay by Jan Procházka. The film was awarded Silver Sail at Locarno Film Festival in 1964.

Plot
13-year-old girl Jitka wanders around Prague. She discovers a hospital garden behind high wall, where a young man on the wheelchair is recovering from his injuries.

Cast
 Radka Dulíková as Jitka
 Vít Olmer as Young man in a wheelchair
 Helena Kružíková as Jitka's mother
 Václav Lohniský as Janitor
 Ivana Bílková as Nurse
 Josef Koza as Hospital attendant
 Andrea Čunderlíková as Girl

References

External links

1963 films
Czech drama films
Czechoslovak drama films
1960s Czech-language films
Czechoslovak black-and-white films
1960s Czech films